Fergusobiidae is a family of nematodes belonging to the order Tylenchida.

Genera:
 Fergusobia Currie, 1937

References

Nematodes